Tom Moran (born 1987) is a British comic writer.

Tom Moran may also refer to:

Tom Moran (blocking back) (1899–1933), American football player
Tom Moran (end) (born 1932), Canadian football player

See also
Thomas Moran (disambiguation)